Boardwalk Empire Volume 2: Music from the HBO Original Series is a soundtrack for the HBO television series Boardwalk Empire, released in September 2013.

Track listing
 "Strut Miss Lizzie", performed by David Johansen
 "Old King Tut", performed by Stephen DeRosa
 "It Had to Be You", performed by Elvis Costello
 "Everybody Loves My Baby", performed by Vince Giordano & the Nighthawks
 "You've Got to See Mama Ev'ry Night (Or You Can't See Mama at All)", performed by Liza Minnelli
 "Baby Won't You Please Come Home", performed by Leon Redbone
 "Make Believe", performed by St. Vincent
 "Lovesick Blues", performed by Pokey LaFarge
 "Nobody Knows You When You're Down and Out", performed by Neko Case
 "Who's Sorry Now", performed by Karen Elson
 "You'd Be Surprised", performed by Stephen DeRosa
 "I'm Going South", performed by Margot Bingham
 "Sugarfoot Stomp", performed by Vince Giordano & the Nighthawks
 "Jimbo Jambo", performed by Rufus Wainwright
 "There'll Be Some Changes Made", performed by Kathy Brier
 "Somebody Loves Me", performed by Margot Bingham
 "All Alone", performed by Chaim Tannenbaum
 "The Prisoner's Song", performed by Loudon Wainwright III
 "I Ain't Got Nobody", performed by Patti Smith
 "I'll See You in My Dreams", performed by Matt Berninger

Track listing adapted from Pitchfork.

Deluxe Version (bonus tracks):
 "Oh! Gee, Oh! Gosh, Oh! Golly I'm In Love", performed by Stephen DeRosa
 "Oh Sister, Ain't That Hot!", performed by Vince Giordano and the Nighthawks
 "Down In Jungle Town", performed by Vince Giordano and the Nighthawks

References

External links
 

2013 compilation albums
2013 soundtrack albums
Boardwalk Empire
Jazz soundtracks
Television soundtracks
ABKCO Records soundtracks
ABKCO Records compilation albums
Albums produced by Stewart Lerman